Lithuania men's national basketball team had its third appearance at the FIBA World Championship at the 2010 FIBA World Championship in Turkey. Despite qualifying only as a wild card invitation by FIBA following an underwhelming performance at EuroBasket 2009, Lithuania had its best performance ever at the World Championship, losing only the semifinal against the United States en route to a bronze medal.

2010 FIBA World Championship Roster

Main roster 

|}
| valign="top" |
 Head coach
 
 Assistant coach(es)
 
 

Legend
 (C) Team captain
 Club field describes current pro club
|}

Reserves roster 

* denotes players that were placed in the main roster.

Candidates that did not make it to the final team:

Preparation matches 
Note: All times are UTC+2

Reserve Team

Main Team

FIBA World Championship 2010 
Note: All times are local

Preliminary round

Knockout stage 

Round of 16

Quarterfinals

Semifinals

Third–place game

Orders, decorations, and medals 
National team players, coaches and staff members were awarded with State orders, decorations and medals for their success.

References 

 
2010
World